Remigiodes is a genus of moths of the family Noctuidae. The genus was erected by George Hampson in 1913.

Species
Remigiodes pectinata (Hampson, 1909)
Remigiodes remigina (Mabille, 1884)
Remigiodes turlini Viette, 1973

References
Hampson, G. F. (1913). Catalogue of the Lepidoptera Phalaenae in the Collection of the British Museum (Natural History). XIII. Noctuidae. 13: i–xiv, 1–609.

Catocalinae
Moth genera